Snooker world rankings 2013/2014: The professional world rankings for all the professional snooker players, who qualified for the 2013–14 season, are listed below. The rankings worked as a two-year rolling list. The points for each tournament two years ago were removed, when the corresponding tournament during the current season finished. The following table contains the rankings, which were used to determine the seedings for certain tournaments.

Notes

 Revision 1 was used for the seeding of the Wuxi Classic, Australian Goldfields Open, Bulgarian Open, Yixing Open and Six-red World Championship.
 Revision 2 was used for the seeding of the Shanghai Masters and Indian Open.
 Revision 3 was used for the seeding of the International Championship.
 Revision 4 was used for the seeding of the UK Championship.
 Revision 5 was used for the seeding of the German Masters, the World Open, the Masters and the Snooker Shoot-Out.
 Revision 6 was used for the seeding of the Welsh Open and the China Open.
 Revision 7 was used for the seeding of the World Championship.

References

2013
Rankings 2014
Rankings 2013